Stateira or Statira may refer to:

People
 Stateira (wife of Artaxerxes II)
 Stateira (wife of Darius III)
 Stateira (wife of Alexander the Great)

Operas
 La Statira (1726), opera by Tomaso Albinoni
 Statira principessa di Persia (1655), opera by Francesco Cavalli

Other
 831 Stateira, an asteroid
 Statira (beetle), a genus of darkling beetle in subfamily Lagriinae
 Statira, a synonym of the moth genus Dasyuris